Alberto Weretilneck (born 11 October 1962) is an Argentine politician currently serving as Senator for Río Negro Province. Previously, from 2012 to 2019, he was the province's governor.

Biography

Born in El Bolsón, Río Negro, he joined the center-left Broad Front, and was elected mayor of Cipolletti, Río Negro Province, in 2007. He became a supporter of Kirchnerism and was elected Vicegovernor in 2011; he was also named Vice President of the Broad Front on December 17, serving with Adriana Puiggrós.

Weretilneck joined Justicialist Party nominee Carlos Soria in December 2010 as his running mate for the 2011 gubernatorial campaign; while they belonged to different parties, their coalition was endorsed by both Weretilneck's Broad Front and President Cristina Kirchner's Front for Victory (which headed the Justicialist Party). Elected with Soria that September in a landslide, Weretilneck became governor on January 1, 2012, after the sudden death of Governor Soria. 

Weretilneck's administration worked closely with the opposition UCR in the Provincial Legislature, while also participating in housing plans funded by the Federal Government which allowed the construction of 2,600 homes. During his first term the Viedma Riverwalk was built, as well as the repavement of Routes 3 and 251 (which serve the province's remote southern half). He also inaugurated 22 new primary schools and extended the school; among the new schools opened was the Lucerinta Cañumil Elementary School, the first officially bilingual Mapudungun/Spanish school in the province. 

Governor Weretilneck was comfortably reelected to a second term in 2015. His Juntos Somos Río Negro (Together We Are Río Negro) alliance defeated the Front for Victory (FpV) candidate, Senator Miguel Ángel Pichetto, by 53% to 34%.

References

1962 births
Living people
People from Río Negro Province
Governors of Río Negro Province
Vice Governors of Río Negro Province
Broad Front (Argentina) politicians
Knights Grand Cross of the Order of Isabella the Catholic
Members of the Argentine Senate for Río Negro